Events from the year 1816 in France

Incumbents
 Monarch – Louis XVIII
 Prime Minister – Armand-Emmanuel de Vignerot du Plessis, Duc de Richelieu

Events
 2 July – French frigate Méduse (1810) runs aground off the coast of Senegal, with 140 lives lost in the botched rescue that takes weeks, leading to a scandal in the French government.
 25 September and 4 October – 1816 French legislative election.

Arts and culture 
 The Académie des Beaux-Arts established

Finance 
 Caisse des dépôts et consignations established

Births
 18 February – Ferdinand Dugué, poet and playwright (died 1913)
 19 February – Louis-Guillaume Perreaux, inventor and engineer (died 1889)
 14 July – Arthur de Gobineau, aristocrat, novelist, diplomat, travel writer and racist theorist (died 1882 in Italy)
 4 September – François Bazin, opera composer (died 1878)
 29 September – Paul Féval, père, novelist and dramatist (died 1887)

Deaths

 2 January – Louis-Bernard Guyton de Morveau, chemist and politician (born 1737) 
 16 January – Jacques-René Tenon, surgeon (born 1724) 
 31 March – Jean-François Ducis, dramatist (born 1733)
 8 April – Julie Billiart, religious leader (born 1751) 
 28 April – Edme Mentelle, geographer (born 1730) 
 4 May – Marie-Madeleine Guimard, ballerina (born 1743) 
 7 June – Louis-Mathias, Count de Barral, clergyman (born 1746) 
 4 August – François-André Vincent, painter (born 1746) 
 7 August – François-Joseph Duret, sculptor (born 1729) 
 30 September – Joseph Caillot, actor and singer (born 1733) 
 18 October – Claude Dejoux, sculptor (born 1732) 
 21 December – Jean-Pierre-André Amar, politician (born 1755)

Exact date missing 
 François-Guillaume Ménageot, painter (born 1744)

See also

References

1810s in France